The Games Affair (1975), directed by Bruce Clark, was New Zealand's first teens/children's television serial. The Games Affair was a six-part thriller- fantasy serial for children shown on the New Zealand Broadcasting Corporation where 3 teenagers unintentionally become involved with solving the no-good antics of a professor and his two assistants during the Christchurch Xth Commonwealth Games.  

The show begins with Henry Ropata and his son Chris arriving at Harewood Airport to pick up Australian teenager Alley Jones and Canadian Paul Chapman whom they are billeting during the Commonwealth Youth Conference, held in conjunction with the Games. They stumble upon attempts by a mad professor who uses his two assistants to shoot powerful enhancer drugs into athletes during the Games.

Cast
Heroes
Brent Bullis
Debbie Gowland
Dominic Solia

Villains
John Bach
Herb Gott
Lynsay Laws

Other 
Elizabeth McRae
Tom Poata

Episodes
"A Question of Possibility"
"The Porcelain Runner"
"A Rude Awakening"
"This Time we Have Them"
"Day of Triumph"
"Back to the Beginning"

Notable Moments 
 An elderly lady watching the athletic events was inadvertently hit with the enhancer when the assistant wielding the dart gun was distracted. The old lady ended up running - and winning - the 100 metres sprint as a result.
 A Traffic officer stopping the scientist's car on the grounds of it being unregistered and unsafe was shot with the enhancer. The officer ended up - after doing several super-fast star-jumps - uncontrollably running away from the scene faster than his motorcycle.
 A high-diver shot with the enhancer ended up crashing through the ceiling, and flying for quite a distance - surprising the passengers of an NAC Boeing 737 - before landing in a river some miles away from the stadium.

References

1970s New Zealand television series
1975 New Zealand television series debuts
1975 New Zealand television series endings
Doping in sport
New Zealand children's television series
New Zealand science fiction television series
Television shows filmed in New Zealand
TVNZ 1 original programming